Soldiers without Uniforms is a 1944 Belgian film directed by E.G. de Meyst.

It recorded admissions in France of 1,509,337.

References

External links
 

1944 films
Belgian black-and-white films
Belgian war films
1944 war films